Anandapuram is a suburb and a mandal of Visakhapatnam district in the state of Andhra Pradesh, India.

It is a Road junction on the National Highway 16 between Visakhapatnam and Srikakulam. There is a connecting road goes to Simhachalam and Pendurthi.

Transport
APSRTC routes

References 

Road junctions in India
Neighbourhoods in Visakhapatnam